Ernald Oak Scattergood (29 May 1887 – 2 July 1932) was an English professional footballer who played as a goalkeeper in the Football League for Bradford Park Avenue and Derby County. He won one cap for England in 1913.

Personal life
As of 1901, Scattergood was working as a colliery trammer. He married in 1910 and had two children, one of whom, Ken, also become a goalkeeper. Scattergood served as a gunner in the Royal Garrison Artillery during the First World War.

Career statistics

Honours 
Derby County

 Football League Second Division: 1911–12

References

1887 births
1932 deaths
English footballers
England international footballers
Derby County F.C. players
Bradford (Park Avenue) A.F.C. players
English Football League players
Association football goalkeepers
Alfreton Town F.C. players
British Army personnel of World War I
Royal Garrison Artillery soldiers
Footballers from Derbyshire
Military personnel from Derbyshire